Omar Fayed (born October 1987) is an environmentalist and publisher. He is CEO of ESTEE (Earth Space Technical Ecosystem Enterprises), based in Switzerland and Britain, that advocates human space exploration, space colonization, and sustainable human development within the biosphere. He is co-founder and CEO of EarthX, a data visualization and mapping company based on NASA’s World Wind Project. He is chairman of Synergetic Press based in New Mexico, and a fellow of the Institute of Ecotechnics.

Fayed was ranked 75, in Arabian Business magazine's "Power 100" list in 2009.

Career 
Fayed started in business as a teenager trading commodities. In 2006, aged 19, he was appointed to the Harrods board and in ten subsidiary companies including Fulham F.C. and the Ritz Hotel in Paris. Fayed was expected to take over as chairman of Harrods, however he resigned in 2009 to pursue his studies for an MBA. He expressed a desire to focus on environmental entrepreneurship instead, commenting in an interview, "that consumerist culture wasn’t doing anything positive for the future of humanity." His father Mohamed Al-Fayed, subsequently sold Harrods in 2010, to Qatar Holdings, the sovereign wealth fund of the emirate of Qatar, for £1.5 billion ($2.3 billion).

Fayed is chairman of Biotecture, a provider of modular green wall systems, that built large-scale living walls for the Walkie Talkie skyscraper in the City of London, and the Veolia recycling and energy recovery facility in Leeds. In 2014, he founded Living City, an initiative to connect and consult green enterprises and government projects.

Omar Fayed is a director of the Ritz Hotel Paris, and the satirical magazine Punch. Punch ceased print publishing in 2002. Fayed continues to publish Punch posts via Facebook, as the page editor.

He was executive producer for the 2015 documentary film The Sunshine Makers, about the manufacture of the psychedelic compound LSD in the 1960s.

References

External links 
Earth Space Technical Ecosystem Enterprises Website
Living City Website
Omar Fayed on Twitter

Punch magazine on Twitter

Harrods
Egyptian Muslims
Egyptian businesspeople
El Fayed family
Living people
1984 births